The 1994 World Series of Poker (WSOP) was a series of poker tournaments held at Binion's Horseshoe.

Preliminary events

Main Event
There were 268 entrants to the main event. Each paid $10,000 to enter the tournament.  Since this was the 25th anniversary of the Main Event, the winner received $1,000,000, plus his/her weight in silver, in celebration of the WSOP's silver anniversary.

Final table

* Hamilton also won his weight in silver

Other High Finishes
NB: This list is restricted to top 30 finishers with an existing Wikipedia entry.

References

World Series of Poker
World Series of Poker
World Series of Poker